The 2009 Swan Islands earthquake occurred on May 28 at  with a moment magnitude of 7.3 and a maximum Mercalli intensity of VII (Very strong). Three aftershocks followed the earthquake within magnitude 4 range.

Earthquake
It was a result of left-lateral strike-slip faulting. The Swan Island Transform Fault forms part of the tectonic boundary between the North American Plate and the Caribbean Plate, and continues onshore as the Motagua Fault and the Chixoy-Polochic Fault.

The 30-second offshore quake was felt in Guatemala, El Salvador, Belize, and as far as Cancún in Mexico. It was also felt in parts of Nicaragua, Costa Rica, Panama, Colombia, Cuba, Jamaica, and the Cayman Islands.

Analysis of geodetic and seismic data indicated that up to 1 meter of slip occurred across a 250-km-long fault rupture. Although the epicenter was located far off the coast of Central America, the long rupture contributed to severe damage in Honduras. The earthquake ruptured a segment of plate boundary immediately east of the 1976 earthquake rupture on the Motagua Fault.

Tsunami

Damage

The earthquake caused at least seven fatalities, 40 injuries, and more than 130 collapsed or damaged buildings across northern Honduras. Two important bridges and a number of levees and port terminals were also seriously damaged. In the Guatemalan department of Izabal, 35 buildings were destroyed and 80 were damaged. In Belize, at least 5 buildings were also destroyed and 25 were damaged.  In Roatan, one home was damaged and one injury occurred. The earthquake caused an estimated $37 million worth of damage, and electricity, Internet and telephone connections were cut throughout the majority of Honduras.

A tsunami watch was put into effect by the Pacific Tsunami Warning Center for Honduras, Guatemala, and Belize and was discontinued 90 minutes after the earthquake occurred.

See also
 List of earthquakes in 2009
 2018 Swan Islands earthquake

References

Further reading

External links

The Magnitude 7.3 Honduras Earthquake May 28, 2009 – ExploringEarth

2009 Honduras
Honduras
Earthquake
Earthquake
Earthquake
May 2009 events in North America
2009 tsunamis